Michal Špit (born 9 April 1975) is a retired footballer from the Czech Republic. In his playing career, he played for teams including Jablonec and Sparta Prague.

In the 2006–07 Czech First League, Špit was one of four players in the league to play every minute of every match.

References

External links
 
 Guardian Football

1975 births
Living people
Czech footballers
Czech First League players
1. SC Znojmo players
AC Sparta Prague players
FK Jablonec players
Association football goalkeepers
Footballers from Prague
1. FK Příbram players
MFK Chrudim players